Five by Four is a 2003 Indian English film written and directed by Roopa Swaninathan. It stars VJs Cary Edwards, Sapna and Usha Seetharam, Eashwar Rao, television artistes Venkat, Preetha Raaghav and Divyadarshini and popular Kannada model Hardeep Minhas. The music was by Yuvan Shankar Raja and cinematography by Ravi Varman. The film in English was produced by the National Film Development Corporation of India (NFDC). It did not get a theatrical release, but was screened at the Shanghai International Film Festival, the Writers market at Santa Monica, and other venues.

Cast
 Cary Edwards as Nayan
 Eashwar Rao as Ajay
 Venkat as the stranger
 Divyadarshini as Namitha
 Hardeep Minhas as Aishwarya
 Preetha as Shruti
 Sapna as Shikha Iyer
 Usha Seetharam as Meera
 Sujata Panju as Meenakshi
 Biniu Jha as Renu
 Prabhu as Martin
 Amar as Abhijeet

Production
Roopa Swaminathan signed up with Penguin and was writing short stories for a book. She thought the stories could be made into a feature films and approached the National Film Development Corporation of India. The film consists of four stories about a gang of five girls. She first named the film "Five String Quartet". The film was shot entirely in Tamil Nadu. The director planned to shoot the whole film  in 25 days, but completed it in 18 days as she had rehearsed with the actors for nearly four months. Swaminathan also wrote about her experience making the film in her book Stardust: Vignettes from the Fringes of Film Industry, which won the National Film Award for Best Book on Cinema.

References

External links
 Five by Four at Cinemas of India
 

2003 films
2000s English-language films